Carl Gustav Sparre Olsen (April 25, 1903 – November 8, 1984) was a Norwegian violinist and composer.  His composition style is lyrical with a strong grounding in Norwegian folk tunes.

Life
Carl Gustav Sparre Olsen was born in Stavanger, Norway. When he was a year old, the family moved to Copenhagen, but settled in Oslo during 1909. From 1922, he studied violin with Herman van der Vegt. In 1923, he became a violinist at the Oslo Philharmonic.  He continued there for the next ten years. From 1926 until 1930, he received instruction in composition from Norwegian composer Fartein Valen. He also traveled to Berlin, Germany to study with composer Max Butting from 1930-31. He also traveled to London to study with Australian-born composer and pianist Percy Grainger in 1936. Starting in 1934, he accepted a teaching position at Griegakademiet, the music conservatory in Bergen, Norway.  His teaching position continued until the early 1940s. During the same period he conducted for the Bergen Trade Unions Choir.  Olsen was also a critic for the newspaper Bergens Tidende.

In 1936, he became a nationally sponsored artist (komponistgasje) and had started receiving state income for artists. After World War II  broke out in 1940, moved to Nordfjord where  he lived until 1947, when he settled in  Gausdal in Oppland and lived there until 1966, he settled in Lillehammer.

Composer 
Olsen wrote a significant amount of large choral pieces, orchestral works, and songs.  In the 1920s, his music was primary inspired by Norwegian folk songs and is considered harmonically influenced by Norwegian composer Edvard Grieg.  His later music is miniaturist in nature, his compositional style likened to that of Fartein Valen, his compositional instructor.  In the 1930s,  he composed large instrumental works inspired by Norwegian poet Olav Aukrust.  He also wrote  Nine Wood-reliefs with Colours, music for paintings by Norwegian painter and sculptor Dagfinn Werenskiold (1892–1977) .

In 1937, he composed Draumkvædet and some cantatas.  He composed music for orchestra, chamber ensembles, and choir and orchestra similar to Faure's Requiem.  The most important work that stemmed after World War II were the Seven Songs to Poems.  The poems were written by Norwegian writer Inge Krokann.  Around this period he composed Nidarosdomen, an orchestral piece.  Other important works include Ver Sanctum for choir and orchestra,  Frå Telemark, a folk song for piano and Leitom-suite for piano.

Later years 
Sparre Olsen was a member of the Norwegian National Broadcasting Council from 1950-58. He also published two biographical writings,  Percy Grainger  (1963) and Tor Jonsson (1968). In 1968, he received the honor of Knighthood in the Royal Norwegian Order of St. Olav. When Sparre Olsen died in Lillehammer during 1984, his urn was set down at the Lom stave church in Gudbrandsdal.

Selected works
Canto 1
Draumkvædet
Frå Telemark
Leitom-suite
Nidarosdomen
Nine Wood-reliefs with Colours
Nocturne for flute and horn, op. 57, no. 2
Norsk kjærleikssong (Norwegian Love Song) for viola or cello and piano, Op.36 No.3
Seven Songs to Poems
Tre Dialoger (Three Dialogues) for flute and viola, Op.50 (1976)
Ver sanctum

References

Other sources
  Gaukstad, Øystein Sparre Olsen bibliography (in "Metamorfose. Festskrift til C. G. Sparre Olsen". Universitetsforlaget, 1983)

External links
Music Information Centre Norway biography
Musikk-Huset Forlag (publisher): Sparre Olsen

Norwegian classical composers
Norwegian classical violinists
Male classical violinists
Norwegian classical musicians
Norwegian artists
Norwegian male artists
Norwegian conductors (music)
Male conductors (music)
20th-century classical composers
1903 births
1984 deaths
20th-century conductors (music)
20th-century classical violinists
Norwegian male classical composers
20th-century Norwegian male musicians
People from Gausdal
Musicians from Stavanger